United Nations Security Council resolution 573, adopted on 4 October 1985, after hearing a complaint by Tunisia, the Council condemned an air raid on the country by the Air Force of Israel on 1 October. The Palestine Liberation Organization (PLO) headquarters was targeted in the attack, after Israel had responded to the murder of three Israeli citizens in Cyprus.

The Council reminded States to refrain from threats or the use of force in their international relations, in accordance with the United Nations Charter. Considering that Israel had admitted to the attack immediately after carrying it out, the Council demanded that Israel refrain from further such attacks, urging Member States to dissuade Israel from doing so. It also noted that Tunisia had the right to reparations considering the loss of life and material damage caused.

Finally, Resolution 573 requested the Secretary-General to submit a report on the implementation of the current resolution by 30 November 1985.

The resolution was adopted by 14 votes to none, with one abstention from the United States.

See also
 Arab–Israeli conflict
 List of United Nations Security Council Resolutions 501 to 600 (1982–1987)
 Operation Wooden Leg
 United Nations Security Council Resolution 611

References

External links
 
Text of the Resolution at undocs.org

 0573
 0573
 0573
Israel–Tunisia relations
1985 in Israel
1985 in Tunisia
 0573
October 1985 events